The 1761 Lisbon earthquake and its subsequent tsunami occurred in the north Atlantic Ocean and south of the Iberian Peninsula. This violent shock which struck just after noon on 31 March 1761, was felt across many parts of Western Europe. Its direct effects were even observed far north in Scotland and Amsterdam, and to the south in the Canary Islands of Spain. The estimated surface-wave magnitude 8.5 event was the largest in the region, and the most significant earthquake in Europe since the Great Lisbon earthquake of 1755.

Records of this disaster are sparse as the Portuguese government censored much information in order to avoid panic in the already ruined city. Damage was significant in older parts of the city and among buildings damaged by the previous earthquake.

Tectonic setting 
The Azores-Gibraltar Fault forms part of the complex and poorly defined plate boundary between the African and Eurasian tectonic plates, which converge at a rate of /yr. Here, a zone of strike-slip and thrust faults accommodate motion between the two plates, including the Horseshoe Fault, Marques Pombal Fault, Gorringe Bank Fault and Cádiz Subduction Zone.

The Coral Patch Thrust Fault is a component in the Africa-Eurasia plate boundary. From an analysis of the reported duration of shaking, the rupture was suggested to propagate northwards, from the northern end of the 1755 rupture. This earthquake is likely a result of coulomb stress transfer from the 1755 event. Based on measuring the tsunami run-up height, the estimated tsunami magnitude for this earthquake is 8.5, and is unlikely that it was larger than the 1755 event.

Earthquake 
At noon on 31 March, the Portuguese city of Lisbon was rocked by an earthquake for three to seven minutes. Ruins in the city left by the 1755 earthquake collapsed while frightened residents ran outside. Shipping vessels offshore felt jolts during the earthquake. It was felt in many cities of Spain including Madrid and Aranjuez. Other locations that felt the earthquake include Bayonne, Bordeaux and Roussillon in Southern France, Amsterdam in the Netherlands, Cork in Ireland, and the Azores Islands.

Much of the damage in Lisbon was to older houses and to buildings already compromised by the 1755 earthquake. Piles of debris from the previous quake collapsed. The nearby mountain ranges were affected by rockslides. Shaking damaged a prison, and some 300 inmates managed to escape. Surprisingly, there were no deaths in Lisbon but the damage was greater than 20,000 moidores (Portuguese gold coins). On the Modified Mercalli intensity scale, the earthquake reached an estimated VI–VII (Strong–Very strong). The greatest destruction was in Setúbal and Vila Franca. In Porto, the city suffered heavy damage worse than that sustained in 1755, resulting in several people being killed. In Madeira, rockfalls were triggered, tumbling into the sea and destroying a church. Four people died as a result, with two being crushed while fishing when boulders tumbled on them. 

In Madrid, ground motions persisted for five to 23 minutes. Some houses shook violently, causing furniture to topple. Frightened residents ran out of their houses for fear of them collapsing. This prompted an inquiry from the Council of Castile and Roman Catholic Diocese of Cartagena to obtain more information about the earthquake. In Cork, Ireland, the city experienced strong shaking described as more violent than in 1755. The unusual lake behavior persisted for 45 minutes to an hour. In Amsterdam, the chandelier of a church started vibrating in the afternoon, an occurrence possibly associated with the earthquake.

Tsunami 
The sea retreated and advanced repeatedly even 13 hours after the earthquake, continuing into the night. On Terceira Island in the Azores, the tsunami picked up boats and smashed them against the rocky coastline. Along the coasts of Spain, changes to the sea were witnessed but there were no records of the tsunami arriving, nor their heights.

At Mount's Bay in Cornwall, a tsunami of up to  advanced five times, beginning at 17:00. and lasting for an hour. Penzance saw waves up to  arriving five times in the early evening. At Newlyn, the sea rose nearly six feet. Along the Irish coasts, the same phenomena were observed. At Kinsale, at about 18:00, the sea rose suddenly  and retreated rapidly in four minutes, this being repeated, though to a less extent, several times. At Carrick, at 16:00, the surface of the River Suir rose  in five minutes. At Dungarvan, the sea ebbed and flowed five times between 4 and 9 p.m. At Waterford, the sea advanced  along the shore, while at Ross, County Wexford, a violent agitation of the river occurred at 19:00.

See also 

List of historical earthquakes
List of earthquakes in the Azores
List of earthquakes in Portugal
Teletsunami

References 

1761 disasters in Africa
1761 in Portugal
Earthquakes in Portugal
Events in Lisbon
Earthquakes in Spain
1761
Earthquakes in Morocco
18th century in Portugal